Gann Valley is a census-designated place in and the county seat of Buffalo County, South Dakota, United States. The town had a population of 14 as of the 2010 census. It is the smallest unincorporated county seat in the United States.

Description
The community was founded in 1885 by Herst Gann in a valley on Crow Creek just east of the Crow Creek Reservation.  Gann donated the courthouse in the community and A.L. Spencer donated 30 acres, resulting in the community becoming the county seat.  In 1886 the county seat was moved to Buffalo Center but was moved back to Gann in 1888.

Its ZIP code is 57341.

The center of population of South Dakota is located in Gann Valley. Gann Valley holds the record for the hottest temperature in South Dakota.

Climate
This climatic region is typified by large seasonal temperature differences, with warm to hot (and often humid) summers and cold (sometimes severely cold) winters.  According to the Köppen climate classification system, Gann Valley has a humid continental climate, abbreviated "Dfa" on climate maps.

See also
 List of census-designated places in South Dakota

References

Census-designated places in Buffalo County, South Dakota
Census-designated places in South Dakota
County seats in South Dakota
Populated places established in 1885
1885 establishments in Dakota Territory